Jacek Jankowski (born 19 June 1969 in Warsaw) is a Polish diplomat, Poland ambassador to Ethiopia (2012-2017) and the European Union ambassador to Zambia (since 2019).

Life 
Jankowski graduated from Political Sciences at the University of Warsaw (M.A., 1994), Banking and Finances at the SGH Warsaw School of Economics (M.A., 1998), and International Relations at the Columbia University (M.A., 2001).

In 1994, he began his professional career as a specialist at the Council of Ministers Office where he was working until 1997 (then named Chancery of the Prime Minister). From January 1998 to August 2000 he worked for the Energy Regulatory Authority of Poland. He spent four months in 2001 in Washington, D.C. as the World Bank specialist for development policy of Africa. Between 2005 and 2012, he was working at the Permanent Representation of Poland to the European Union in Brussels, being responsible for Polish foreign policy at the European Parliament, and relations with Sub-Saharan Africa countries. Between November 2012 and 2017, he was serving as Poland ambassador to Ethiopia, being accredited to Djibouti, and the African Union, as well. Back in Warsaw he was deputy director at the Political Director's Office, Ministry of Foreign Affairs of Poland. In 2019, he was nominated European Union ambassador to Zambia.

In 2014, he was honoured by the Minister of Foreign Affairs "Amicus Oeconomiae" award for supporting abroad Polish entrepreneurs.

Besides Polish, he speaks English, French, German, and Russian.

References 

1969 births
Ambassadors of Poland to Ethiopia
Ambassadors of the European Union to Zambia
Columbia University alumni
Living people
Diplomats from Warsaw
SGH Warsaw School of Economics alumni
University of Warsaw alumni